The 26th Lo Nuestro Awards were presented by the American network Univision, honoring the best Latin music of 2013 in the United States. The ceremony took place on February 20, 2014, at the American Airlines Arena in Miami, Florida beginning at 5:00 p.m. PST (8:00 p.m. EST). The Lo Nuestro Awards were presented in 33 categories and it was televised by Univision. Mexican singer Ninel Conde and Cuban American actor William Levy hosted the show.

American singer Prince Royce earned three awards including Artist of the Year; American artist Marc Anthony received five accolades. Multiple winners also included deceased Mexican-American performer Jenni Rivera, Puerto-Rican American singers Tito El Bambino and Olga Tañón, Mexican-American norteño artist Gerardo Ortíz, and American rapper Pitbull. Puerto-Rican American artist Luis Fonsi and American singer Jencarlos Canela premiered their new singles, and the closing of the show featured the supergroup Salsa Giants. Most performers expressed solidarity with the Venezuelan protests during their participation on the show. The telecast garnered in average 9.5 million viewers in North America.

Winners and nominees 

The nominees for the 26th Lo Nuestro Awards were announced on December 3, 2013 on the morning show ¡Despierta América! by several artists including Elvis Crespo, Chino & Nacho, Mané de la Parra, Alejandra Espinoza, Leslie Grace, Rigú, and Tommy Torres. Spanish singer-songwriter Alejandro Sanz, artists Marc Anthony and Prince Royce, and Colombian performer Carlos Vives received the most number of nominations, with five each. The winners were announced before the live audience during the ceremony, with American singer Jenni Rivera being one of the most awarded performers, earning three accolades, including Pop Song ("Detrás de Mi Ventana"), Pop and Regional Mexican Female Artist.

Anthony became the night's biggest winner, receiving four accolades (Tropical Album, Tropical Song, Salsa Artist and Collaboration of the Year for the song "¿Por Qué Les Mientes?" with Tito El Bambino). Anthony also was the recipient of the Excellence Award. American singer Prince Royce was named Artist of the Year and was nominated for the same award at the 2014 Latin Billboard Music Awards. Habítame Siempre by Mexican performer Thalía was the Pop Album of the Year. Upon release, the album reached number-one on the Billboard Top Latin Albums chart. American rapper Pitbull won for Urban Artist and his song "Echa Pa'lla (Manos Pa'rriba)" was the Urban Song of the Year. The song also won the Latin Grammy Award for Best Urban Performance. Mexican rock singer Alejandra Guzmán received the Lifetime Achievement Award; fellow Mexican band 3Ball MTY earned the first Tribal Artist prize, which was criticized by Antonio Tinoco, of the website Latin Times, as the category seemed "to have been made exclusively" to recognize the band. Puerto-Rican American performer Daddy Yankee was named "Youth Idol", which was also scrutinized by Tinoco, since "Daddy has not been relevant in music for quite a while," and accused Univision for awarding him in order to secure his performance on the show.

Winners are listed first, highlighted in boldface and indicated with a double-dagger.

Presenters and performers
The following individuals and groups, listed in order of appearance, presented awards or performed musical numbers.

Presenters

Note: The remaining awards were announced at the Lo Nuestro Awards website.

Musical performers

The telecast included seventeen musical performances. American singer Víctor Manuelle opened the show with "Mi Salsa Alegra la Fiesta". Mexican actor Diego Luna presented his film Cesar Chavez and the performance by Spanish singer-songwriter Enrique Iglesias, who featured two guests, Mexican artist Marco Antonio Solís (on his single "El Perdedor"), and  Pitbull, on their collaborative song "I'm a Freak". Puerto-Rican American singer Jencarlos Canela premiered his new single "Irreparable".

Mexican-American performer Pepe Aguilar performed a medley of "Cuánto Te Debo"/"Acá Entre Nos". Daddy Yankee appeared twice on stage, the first time on his own with "La Nueva y la Ex", and as a guest performer with fellow rapper Yandel on the song "Moviendo Caderas". Mexican rock singer Alejandra Guzmán was celebrating her twenty-fifth anniversary of her musical career and performed "Mi Peor Error". Puerto-Rican artist Luis Fonsi debuted his single "Corazón en La Maleta", two years after his last appearance on the show. Rapper J Balvin, bachata performer Romeo Santos, Mexican singer-songwriter Gloria Trevi and band Voz de Mando also performed.

Puerto-Rican American singer Marc Anthony sung "Cambio de Piel" and "Vivir Mi Vida". The final performers were the supergroup Salsa Giants, formed by producer Sergio George with singers Charlie Zaa, Cheo Feliciano, Ismael Miranda, José Alberto "El Canario", Nora, Oscar D'León, Tito Nieves, and Willy Chirino.

Most performers expressed solidarity with the Venezuelan protests during their participation on the show, including Anthony, Iglesias, and Solís.  The Venezuelan duo Chino & Nacho said "it's time we raised our voice for a country that has lost respect for life, a country where ideological fanaticism has divided the people"; while Anthony declared "you are not alone." Jencarlos Canela during his performance shouted: "Venezuela fight for your peace and freedom, we all are with you." Solís and Daddy Yankee dedicated their awards to the country. The hosts, Ninel Conde and William Levy asked the audience to pray for Venezuela.

Source:

Ceremony information

Categories and voting process
The categories considered were for the Pop, Tropical, Regional Mexican, Tribal, and Urban genres, with additional awards for the General Field that includes nominees from all genres, for the Artist of the Year, Collaboration and Music Video categories. The nominees were selected through an online voting poll at the official website; the winners were chosen from a total of 130 nominations in 33 different categories. The ceremony was produced by Antonio Guzmán, while Mexican singer Ninel Conde and Cuban American actor William Levy hosted the show.

Ratings and reception
The American telecast on Univision drew in an average 9.5 million people during its three hours of length. Univision was the second in the ratings at the 18–34 and 18–49 demographics, over ABC, CBS and Fox. The 2014 ceremony garnered more Latin viewers than the American Music Awards, Billboard Music Awards, and Primetime Emmy Awards of 2013, combined. Regarding the social media interaction, Univision and the Lo Nuestro Awards were the number-one social network and program; the show was the most socially active program in the network history, and the most active of 2014 to that date. The broadcast was the second most engaging entertainment show regardless of language or network, over the Critic's Choice Movie Awards, Golden Globe Awards, People's Choice Awards and Screen Actors Guild Awards.

See also
2013 in Latin music
Latin Grammy Awards of 2013
Latin Grammy Awards of 2014

References

2014 music awards
Lo Nuestro Awards by year
2014 in Florida
2014 in Latin music
2010s in Miami